Iglenik is a settlement in the Gorjanci Hills in the City Municipality of Novo Mesto in southeastern Slovenia, close to the border with Croatia. The area is part of the traditional region of Lower Carniola and is now included in the Southeast Slovenia Statistical Region.

References

External links
Iglenik on Geopedia

Populated places in the City Municipality of Novo Mesto